Chalcosyrphus (Xylotomima) libo (Walker, 1849 ), the Long-haired Leafwalker, is an uncommon species of syrphid fly  observed in north-central North America. Hoverflies are able to remain nearly motionless in flight. The adults are also known as flower flies for they are commonly found around and on flowers, from which they get both energy-giving nectar and protein-rich pollen.

Distribution
Canada, United States.

References

Eristalinae
Insects described in 1849
Diptera of North America
Hoverflies of North America
Taxa named by Francis Walker (entomologist)